Jeff Bennett (born 1962) is an American voice actor.

Jeff or Geoff Bennett may also refer to:

Jeff Bennett (baseball) (born 1980), American baseball pitcher
Jeff Bennett (athlete) (born 1948), American decathlete
Jeff Bennett, a fictional character of Taxi
Geoff Bennett, Australian field hockey player
Geoff Bennett (journalist), American journalist and television news presenter
Geoffrey Bennett (1908–1983), British Royal Navy officer and author
Geoffrey Thomas Bennett, English mathematician